Marie Aurelie Carinne Alcindor (born March 20, 1994) is a Mauritian sprinter. She competed at the 2016 Summer Olympics in the women's 200 metres race; her time of 24.55 seconds in the heats did not qualify her for the semifinals.

International competitions

Personal bests

200 metres – 24.23 (+0.8 m/s, Durban 2016)
400 metres – 54.93 (Durban 2016)

References

External links
 

1994 births
Living people
Mauritian female sprinters
Olympic athletes of Mauritius
Athletes (track and field) at the 2014 Commonwealth Games
Athletes (track and field) at the 2016 Summer Olympics
People from Flacq District
Commonwealth Games competitors for Mauritius
Athletes (track and field) at the 2015 African Games
African Games competitors for Mauritius
Olympic female sprinters